The district of Raron was one of the 12 districts comprising the Republic of Wallis and after 1848 the canton of Valais in Switzerland. Today it is divided into two demi-districts, which are geographically separated by the District of Brig.

The district of East Raron with the capital Mörel-Filet includes the following municipalities:

CH-3991, 3994 Bettmeralp
CH-3983 Bister
CH-3982 Bitsch
CH-3993 Grengiols
CH-3983 Mörel-Filet
CH-3986 Riederalp

The district of West Raron (German: Westlich-Raron, French: Rarogne occidental) with the capital Raron includes the following municipalities:

CH-3938 Ausserberg
CH-3919 Blatten
CH-3935 Bürchen
CH-3943 Eischoll
CH-3916 Ferden
CH-3917 Kippel
CH-3942 Niedergesteln
CH-3942 Raron
CH-3940 Steg-Hohtenn
CH-3944 Unterbäch
CH-3918 Wiler

References 

Former districts of Valais